Mirik is a town in West Bengal, India.  

Mirik may also refer to:

Places 
 Mirik, Azerbaijan
 Mirik, Iran 
Mirik Lake, a lake in the town of Mirik, West Bengal
Mirik subdivision, a subdivision of Darjeeling district, West Bengal
Mirik (community development block), administrative block of Mirik, West Bengal

Food 
 Mirik meatball, a Turkish meatball recipe

People 
 Mirik Milan, a former Amsterdam Night Mayor